Çalıca can refer to:

 Çalıca, Çorum
 Çalıca, Elâzığ
 Çalıca, Gönen